The Premier League is the top football league in Barbados. It was created in 1947 and is headed by the Barbados Football Association. Ten teams participate in this league. It is known as the Digicel Premier League for sponsorship reasons.

Despite being a league competition in CONCACAF none of the Barbadian teams have played in CFU Club Championship or CONCACAF Champions' Cup (the last appearance was in 2000).

The 9th- and 10th-placed teams are relegated to Barbados Division One. Many teams play their home games at the 5,000-capacity Barbados National Stadium in Bridgetown.

Clubs

Barbados Defence Force (Wildey) 
 Empire Club (Bank Hall, Bridgetown)                                                                                                                              
Brittons Hill United (Brittons Hill, Bridgetown)
Ellerton (Ellerton)
Notre Dame (Bayville, Bridgetown)
Paradise (Dover, Christ Church, Barbados)                                                                                  
Silver Sands (Silver Sands, Christ Church, Bridgetown)
UWI Blackbirds (Cave Hill)
St. Andrew Lions (Belleplaine, Saint Andrew, Barbados)
Weymouth Wales (Carrington, Bridgetown)
Deacons FC (Deacons, Saint Michael, Barbados)
Wotton Football Club (Wotton, Christ Church, Barbados)

Champions

Notes
 - Club is now known as Weymouth Wales. The club was called "New South Wales" from 1962 to 1972, and then "Pan-Am Wales" from 1973 to 1977.

Titles by club

Best scorers

See also
Barbados men's national football team
Barbados men's national under-17 football team
Barbados women's national football team
Barbados Football Association
Football in Barbados
Sport in Barbados

References

FIFA Standings
Barbados - List of Champions, RSSSF.com

 
1
Top level football leagues in the Caribbean
1947 establishments in Barbados
Sports leagues established in 1947